S.S. Lazio finished in 10th in Serie A and reached the round of 16 in the Coppa Italia this season. The most significant event was that Sergio Cragnotti, took charge of the club on 20 February 1992, which reignited the club as a force on the transfer market.

Squad

Goalkeepers
  Valerio Fiori
  Fernando Orsi
  Flavio Roma

Defenders
  Cristiano Bergodi
  Luigi Corino
  Angelo Gregucci
  Davide Lampugnani
  Raffaele Sergio
  Roberto Soldà
  Rufo Emiliano Verga
  Claudio Vertova

Midfielders
  Roberto Bacci
  Thomas Doll
  Armando Madonna
  Alessandro Manetti
  Franco Marchegiani
  Stefano Melchiori
  Gabriele Pin
  Claudio Sclosa
  Giovanni Stroppa

Attackers
  Karl-Heinz Riedle
  Rubén Sosa
  Maurizio Neri
  Bernardo Capocchiano

Competitions

Serie A

League table

Matches

Topscorers
  Rubén Sosa (13)
  Karl-Heinz Riedle (13)
  Thomas Doll (7)
  Giovanni Stroppa (4)

Coppa Italia

Second round

Eightfinals

References

S.S. Lazio seasons
Lazio